Edward Eugene Coker (born December 1, 1960 in Midland, Texas) is a children's singer/songwriter from Dallas, Texas, now living in Manitou Springs, Colorado.

Coker grew up in Highland Park, Texas, attended Highland Park High School, and earned a degree in music from Southern Methodist University.  Originally an opera singer, Coker has been writing, recording, and performing children's music since 1987. Coker's songs draw on a wide range of rock and popular influences ranging from The B-52's and Queen to classical music.  His songs and performances also feature fanciful and quirky characters such as Fred, a "purple red-truck-driving duck", and Regina, a musician-turned-construction-worker octopus.

Coker has composed music for Barney & Friends, Chuck E. Cheese's, and Borders Books, and was the host of the Saturday-morning show "The Weird, Wild World of Eddie Coker" on Radio Disney.  He typically performs over 200 concerts a year; fellow Texas musician Sara Hickman described him as "the James Brown of children's music... The hardest-working man in kids' show business."

Discography 
The Happy One (1992)
Say Hello (1994)
Welcome to the Island (1995)
What's Cooking? (1996)
Schnorgel & Berg (1998)
E.C. on CD (compilation) (1998)
Wow! (compilation) (1998)
Hmmm.... (compilation) (1998)
Save Our Planet (compilation) (2000)
Seven Songs (compilation) (2002)
Wezmore (2014)

Videos 
Sock Lobster
Take A Walk on the Child Side
The Bright Side of the Moon
Kids for Character-Himself
Choices Count-Himself
Eddie Coker Rocks Your World

References 
 Ann Pinson, "Eddie Coker", Dallas Morning News, June 3, 2005, p. 36.
 Cindy Boykin, "Eddie Coker", Plano Profile, Sept. 2003.
 Nancy Churnin, "Boy band seeks boy fans using hero approach", Dallas Morning News, August 28, 2000, p. 1C.
 Jodi Duckett, "Opera funnyman finds children don't snore during the show", Allentown Morning Call, March 17, 2000, p. D1.
 Ryan Sanders, "Grand Prairie church kids around", Fort Worth Star-Telegram, Sept. 13, 1998, p. 17.
 Holly Williams, "Eddie Coker: Singer is rockin' the world of children's music", Dallas Morning News, Dec. 29, 1996, p. 1E.

External links 
 

Living people
1960 births
American children's musicians
Musicians from Dallas
Southern Methodist University alumni
People from Manitou Springs, Colorado
People from Midland, Texas
People from Highland Park, Texas